Dragonlance modules and sourcebooks are role-playing game books created for the Dragonlance campaign setting. These books were created for multiple editions of Dungeons & Dragons and for the SAGA System.

Overview

The Dragonlance game project began with Tracy and Laura Hickman, and the idea of a world dominated by dragons. As they drove from Utah to Wisconsin so Tracy could take up a job with TSR in 1981, they discussed this idea. In 1982, Tracy proposed at TSR a series of three modules featuring evil dragons. When this plan reached then head of TSR Gary Gygax, it fitted well with an idea he had considered of doing a series of 12 modules each based on one of the official Monster Manual dragons. The project was then developed, under the code name "Project Overlord" to plan the series. The original group included Tracy Hickman, Harold Johnson, Larry Elmore, Carl Smith and Jeff Grubb. Later in the development process it was decided that a trilogy of fantasy novels would be released with the modules. Originally an external writer was hired, but the design group found themselves more and more disillusioned with his work. At this point it was suggested that Hickman and Margaret Weis, an editor in TSR's book department who had become involved with the project, ought to write the books. They wrote the five chapters over a weekend and were given the job to write the accompanying novels based on that. The first module, Dragons of Despair, was published in March 1984. Then in November 1984, Dragons of Autumn Twilight was published. This novel was written after the completion of the first Dragonlance game modules. Weis and Hickman felt this was constraining and made the novel feel too episodic, so they reversed the process for the next books and completed the novels before the related modules were written. The first Krynn setting guide, Dragonlance Adventures, would follow in 1987. 

When AD&D was updated to the 2nd edition in 1989, the Dragonlance campaign setting was updated as well. In 1993, the product line for AD&D was canceled. However, the Dragonlance fiction line "remained wildly successful" and included "some 60 novels and anthologies"; "TSR wanted to bring those fiction fans back into the roleplaying fold if they could, and so a new team was set to work to create a new Dragonlance game". In 1996, Dragonlance was converted to TSR's new SAGA System with the publication of the Dragonlance: Fifth Age roleplaying game. The SAGA System has a more narrative focused gameplay style than AD&D and uses cards to determine the effects of actions. Shannon Appelcline commented that "the non-AD&D game was not to everyone's taste, but it was extensively supported from 1996-2000, with a timeline that pushed considerably into Krynn's future". The majority of the SAGA line was set during 414 AC, however, the final releases of the line were set in 383 AC. 

After Wizards of the Coast's acquisition of TSR, the 3rd Edition of Dungeons & Dragons was released in 2000 and Wizards announced that the Dragonlance setting would not be supported. However, Wizards allowed a group of fans to support the line for the 3rd Edition on the internet. Initially, the Dragonlance-L mailing list updated the setting; this mailing list would become known as the Whitestone Council and would maintain The Dragonlance Nexus website. The Whitestone Council was supported by both Tracy Hickman and Margaret Weis. Then in 2002, Margaret Weis's company Sovereign Press acquired the license to publish 3rd Edition Dragonlance material. The official update, Dragonlance Campaign Setting, was published in 2003 for the 3.5 Edition; it moved the timeline to 422 AC and was set six months "after the end of the War of Souls trilogy (2000-2002)". Appelcline highlighted that "the Whitestone Council was asked to review Sovereign's manuscript and in a few cases also got to submit minor bits for the new setting book. The Council would continue to be important to Sovereign following the publication of the Dragonlance Campaign Setting, with a few members contributing increasingly large amounts to later releases". Sovereign Press maintained the Dragonlance line until 2007. 

The campaign setting was not supported during the 4th Edition era (2008-2013) of Dungeons & Dragons. In March 2022, Wizards released the PDF Heroes of Krynn which is part of the "Unearthed Arcana" public playtest series for the 5th Edition of Dungeons & Dragons. Polygon commented that this "all but confirmed" the return of the Dragonlance setting. In April 2022, it was announced that the setting will be revisited in December 2022 with a new adventure module for the 5th Edition. This adventure will be set concurrently to the War of the Lance, a fictional conflict in the setting.

Advanced Dungeons & Dragons 1st/2nd Edition

SAGA System

Systemless

Dungeons & Dragons 3rd/3.5 Edition

Dungeons & Dragons 5th Edition

See also
 List of Dungeons & Dragons modules
 Dragons of Light (anthology by Orson Scott Card)

References

External links
 Dragons of Light at a fan made TSR archive
 Dragons of Faith at a fan made TSR archive

Modules and sourcebooks
Lists about role-playing games